1975–76 Gillette Cup may refer to any of three domestic one-day cricket competitions:

 1975–76 Gillette Cup (Australia)
 1975–76 Gillette Cup (South Africa)
 1975–76 Gillette Cup (West Indies)